Lars Axel Larsson (17 June 1911 – 29 January 1993) was a Swedish steeplechase runner. He finished sixth at the 1936 Summer Olympics and won a European title in 1938.

Larsson started as a flat runner and changed to steeplechase in 1936. That year he won the Swedish steeplechase title while finishing second in the 5,000 m. He went on winning the steeplechase title in 1937–40, improving the national record three times, from 9:16.6 in 1936 to 9:09.0 in 1939. He retired in 1941 due to a leg injury and later worked as an office clerk.

References

1911 births
1993 deaths
Swedish male steeplechase runners
Olympic athletes of Sweden
Athletes (track and field) at the 1936 Summer Olympics
European Athletics Championships medalists
People from Lidingö Municipality
Sportspeople from Stockholm County